Michael Thomas Phillips (1851 – 22 February 1905) was an Australian politician.

He was born in Hartley to innkeeper Patrick Phillips and Sarah Walsh. He was a solicitor, working at Molong (1877–85) and Cowra (1885–1905). Around 1880 he married Elizabeth Agnes Finn at Canowindra; they had nine children. In 1896 he was elected in a by-election to the New South Wales Legislative Assembly as the Protectionist member for Cowra, but he retired at the next election in 1898. Phillips died at Cowra in 1905.

References

 

1851 births
1905 deaths
Members of the New South Wales Legislative Assembly
Protectionist Party politicians
19th-century Australian politicians